Rania Salmi (born 14 October 1998) is a Moroccan footballer who plays as a striker for Atlas 05 and the Morocco women's national team.

Club career
Salmi has played for Atlas 05 in Morocco.

International career
Salmi has capped for Morocco at under-20 and senior levels.

International goals
Scores and results list Morocco's goal tally first

See also
List of Morocco women's international footballers

References

External links

1998 births
Living people
Moroccan women's footballers
Women's association football defenders
Morocco women's international footballers